The 31st Regiment Illinois Volunteer Infantry, nicknamed the "Dirty-First," was an infantry regiment that served in the Union Army during the American Civil War.

Service
The 31st Illinois Infantry was organized at Jacksonville, Illinois and mustered into Federal service at Cairo, Illinois, on September 18, 1861. Among the early officers was Major Andrew J. Kuykendall, later a U.S. Representative and Illinois State Senator.

The regiment was mustered out on July 19, 1865, and discharged at Springfield, Illinois, on July 31, 1865.

Total strength and casualties
The regiment suffered 9 officers and 166 enlisted men who were killed in action or who died of their wounds and 1 officer and 293 enlisted men who died of disease, for a total of 471 fatalities.

Commanders
Colonel John A. Logan
Colonel Lindorf Osborn
Colonel Edwin S. McCook - Mustered out with the regiment.

See also
List of Illinois Civil War Units
Illinois in the American Civil War

Notes

References
The Civil War Archive

Units and formations of the Union Army from Illinois
1861 establishments in Illinois
Military units and formations established in 1861
Military units and formations disestablished in 1865